The Bulgarian Pirate Party is a political party in Bulgaria based on the Swedish Pirate Party.  The party is a member of the international Pirate Party movement and is focused on copyright and patent reform, internet freedom, and government transparency.

The party was founded on 11 April 2010, in Sofia, after delegates from 20 Bulgarian towns adopted the articles of constitution and the party's political programme, and elected its national leadership, with Angel Todorov as the so-called National Party Administrator.

References

Bulgaria
Political parties in Bulgaria
Political parties established in 2010
2010 establishments in Bulgaria